Gerd Rüdiger Puin (born 1940) is a German scholar of Oriental studies, specializing in Quranic palaeography, Arabic calligraphy and orthography. He was a lecturer of Arabic language and literature at Saarland University in Saarbrücken, Germany. In regards to his approach of historical research, Puin is considered a representative of the "Saarbrücken School", which is part of the Revisionist School of Islamic Studies.

Discovery of the Sanaa manuscript 

Gerd R. Puin was the head of a restoration project commissioned by the Yemeni government, which spent a significant amount of time examining the ancient Quranic manuscripts discovered in the Great Mosque of Sanaa, Yemen in 1972, in order to find criteria for systematically cataloging them. According to journalist Toby Lester, his examination revealed "unconventional verse orderings, minor textual variations, and rare styles of orthography and artistic embellishment."

These scriptures were written in the early Hijazi Arabic script, matching the pieces of the earliest Quranic manuscripts known to exist. Some of the papyrus on which the text appears shows clear signs of earlier use, being that previous, washed-off writings are also visible on it. In 2008 and 2009, Elisabeth Puin published detailed results of the analysis of "Sanaa manuscript DAM" (dar al-makhtutat) 01.27-1, proving that the text was still in flux in the time span between the scriptio inferior and the scriptio superior of the palimpsest.

More than 15,000 sheets of the Yemeni Quranic manuscripts have painstakingly been cleaned, treated, sorted, cataloged and photographed and 35,000 microfilmed photos have been made of the manuscripts. Some of Puin's initial remarks on his findings are found in his essay titled the "Observations on Early Qur'an Manuscripts in Sana'a", which has been republished in the book What the Koran Really Says (2002), written by the Ex-Muslim author and activist Ibn Warraq. In January 2021, an interview with Puin regarding the discovery of the Sanaa manuscript was conducted by Robert M. Kerr, secretary of the INÂRAH Institute for Research on Early Islamic History and the Koran.

Assessment of the Quran

In a 1999 article published in the American magazine The Atlantic, Gerd R. Puin has been interviewed and quoted as saying that:

Works

See also 
 Patricia Crone
 History of the Quran
 Christoph Luxenberg
 Sana'a manuscript
 John Wansbrough

References
  Reprinted in What the Koran Really Says, ed. Ibn Warraq, Prometheus Books, 2002, .

External links
 Atlantic Monthly article: What is the Koran
 Guardian article: Querying the Koran

1940 births
German Arabists
German Islamic studies scholars
German male non-fiction writers
German orientalists
German palaeographers
History of Quran scholars
Living people